Buddleja davidii var. wilsonii  is endemic to western Hubei, China, at elevations of between 1600 and 2000 m; it was named for the English plant collector Ernest Wilson by Alfred Rehder. The taxonomy of the plant and the other five davidii varieties has been challenged in recent years. Leeuwenberg sank them all as synonyms, considering them to be within the natural variation of a species, a treatment adopted in the Flora of China published in 1996.

Description
Buddleja davidii var. wilsonii is one of the more readily identifiable varieties by virtue of its lax, somewhat pendulous, delicate panicles, < 60 cm long, of lilac-pink flowers; the flowers have reflexed margins to the lobes of the corollas; the leaves are narrower than the type.

Cultivation
Buddleja davidii var. wilsonii is rare in cultivation, and not known to remain in commerce. A large specimen grew against a wall at Forde Abbey, Dorset.

References

davidii
Flora of China